François-Thomas Germain (1726–1791) was a French silversmith who was often commissioned by European royalty. He inherited the title of royal silversmith and sculptor to the King of France from his father, Thomas Germain. In 1765, Germain broke guild regulations by working with financiers to receive some debts owed to him, as he was only allowed to enter into partnerships with his fellow smiths. For this he was forced to resign his position and declare bankruptcy.

Germain died out of the public eye in 1791, the last member of his distinguished family to serve as a royal smith.  Many of his works are now held in museums and private collections.

Curiously enough, due to the French Revolution and other hazards of history, the biggest portion of his production now belongs to countries other than France—namely Portugal and Russia.

In popular culture
A fictionalized version of Germain appears in the 2014 video game Assassin's Creed Unity, as a member of the Templar Order and the main antagonist. He was chosen for the game because of his real-life talent and "unexplained demise."

References

External links 
 Some of the masterpieces in the Museu Nacional de Arte Antiga, Lisbon
 Some of the masterpieces in the Palácio Nacional da Ajuda, Lisbon
 Museu Gulbenkian, Lisbon
 Hermitage Museum, Saint-Petersburg
 Getty Museum, Los Angeles
 Metropolitan Museum of Art, New-York
 Musée du Louvre, Paris
 Musée des Arts Décoratifs, Paris
 Museu Nacional de Arte Antiga, Lisbon
 One of the tureens in the Museu Gulbenkian, Lisbon
 Cleveland Museum of Art, Cleveland
 Walters Art Museum, Maryland
 nr.112, Museum of Fine Arts, Boston

1726 births
1791 deaths
Jacobins
French silversmiths
French decorative artists